El with middle hook (Ԡ ԡ; italics: Ԡ ԡ) is a letter of the Cyrillic script. Its form is derived from the Cyrillic letter El (Л л) by adding a hook to the middle of the right leg.

El with middle hook was only used in the Abkhaz and Chuvash languages.

In Chuvash it was used for the palatalized voiced alveolar lateral approximant [lʲ].

Computing codes

See also 
Ԯ ԯ : Cyrillic letter El with descender
Ӆ ӆ : Cyrillic letter El with tail
Ԓ ԓ : Cyrillic letter El with hook
Љ љ : Cyrillic letter Lje
Cyrillic characters in Unicode

References

Languages of Russia
Turkic languages
Cyrillic letters with diacritics
Letters with hook